DBJ or dbj may refer to:

 Development Bank of Japan, a Japanese development bank
 dbj, the ISO 639-3 code for Ida'an language, Sabah, Malaysia